True Volunteer Foundation (TVF) is a non-governmental organisation which aims to empower people through education. It is headquartered in London, England and was established in 2004. Though its aims to eliminate poverty are similar to many charities, it differs through its operating model, which emphasises a low cost base and works to link together the corporate sector, small charity partners and volunteers. Its core principle and trademark is Pay to Work, and its volunteering ethos is based on the vision that everyone should have a social career which is run in parallel with their paid jobs or studies.

Overview 
True Volunteer Foundation is dedicated to alleviating poverty globally through education. It does this through various means, including the building of schools and the provision of microfinance, capacity building and employment training. It is headquartered in London, England and was established in 2004 by a group of like-minded individuals who wanted to give something back.

The organisation hosted its first fundraising event in Kempton Park, raising funds to build three schools in Sri Lanka; it expanded this to a network of 18 schools across Asia and Africa. Today, True Volunteer Foundation spans across 33 countries, reporting that its projects directly impacted 325,009 people in 2013.

Its core principle and trademark, Pay to Work, enables the organisation to operate within a low cost base and helps ensure no less than 90 per cent of project donations go direct to end beneficiaries. True Volunteer Foundation is reported to be funded through corporate donors and events, and utilises pro bono services from corporate partners and members of the public to operate within what it terms as a pioneering financial model.

Guiding principles

Pay to Work 
True Volunteer Foundation works with over 100 volunteers who donate between 5 and 35 hours per week to run projects for the organisation. True Volunteers do not get paid and do not claim general expenses. The organisation calls this principle Pay to Work, which is a registered trademark of the charity. The Pay to Work principle is central to its model and is embedded into every aspect of the charity's work.

Pay to Work enables the organisation to work within a low cost base. According to Michael Padmanathan, founder of True Volunteer Foundation, “this approach is highly appealing for volunteers and corporate sponsors, who are often put off by the high running costs of traditional charities”.

Volunteers are vital to the financial model: by not claiming a charge for their services or expenses they are effectively meeting a significant proportion of the organisations’ cost base.

Social career 
True Volunteer Foundation's volunteering ethos is based on the vision that everyone should have a social career which is run in parallel with their paid jobs or studies. People volunteer for the organisation on their own terms, specifying how much time they want to dedicate; and they can volunteer either from home, the office, in the field or commuting to and from their day jobs or studies.

Called ‘True Volunteers’, each person is given a functional or project role within the organisation which matches their interests, skills and availability. Roles range from Head of Department to Country Manager, and from Accountants to Fundraisers. The organisation's goal is to provide a platform for individuals to give back to society so they can empower those less fortunate than themselves.

Corporate social responsibility 
The corporate sector is the major source of funding for True Volunteer Foundation, either through project-based funding as part of a company's corporate social responsibility (CSR) program, or the provision of pro bono professional products and services. The charity offers bespoke charity projects, allowing sponsors to input into the projects in a way that aligns with the company's own goals and priorities: its proposition to the corporate sector is "let us do the work you want to see done". To date the organisation states it works with 50 corporate partners offering tailored CSR programmes.

Its funding model is set up to enable corporate partners to support its work across three areas: funders and pro bono partners who meet core costs (e.g. office costs, marketing and administration); partners to fund charitable projects; and pro bono event partners to meet costs in running the charity's event programme.

Partnership approach
True Volunteer Foundation states that its model of working with three parties makes it unique within the charity sector: the charity works to link together the corporate sector, small charity partners and True Volunteers. The organisation uses this approach to overcome three issues it identified in the sector, which are corporates needing support with charitable giving; small charities needing support with securing funding and delivering projects; and volunteers wanting to give back on their own terms.

The organisation works to provide approximately 92 small charities with the resources to become successful. This may include access to funding, volunteer resources or project management support, so that True Volunteer Foundation and its charity partners can jointly deliver projects. To date it states that it has jointly delivered over 100 International and UK Projects with its small charity partners.

The charity also partners with over 30 universities in the UK and Europe, providing student work placements across different study disciplines. Its aim is to offer volunteer roles which educate the next generation in social responsibility.

Main projects

Computing for One Million people, Madagascar  
In 2010, True Volunteer Foundation partnered with the Madagascan Government, Microsoft and the Dodwell Trust to roll out a country wide program bringing essential computing resources and skills to one million people by 2015. The partnership provided 480 computers in 40 training rooms to teach computer literacy in schools and regional resource centres across Madagascar.

Wimbledon Sporting Project, UK  
Launched in 2012 to coincide with the London 2012 Olympic Games, the Wimbledon Sporting Project is a five-year educational programme, which includes films, books and sporting activities provided to schools in the London Borough of Merton at no cost. Through a mixture of sport history, stories from sporting champions and practical sports packages, the aim of the project is to inspire the next generation of sporting champions.

In May 2012, the Common Ground film premièred at the Odeon in Wimbledon, bringing together celebrities, corporate donors and schools to provide sustainable sports education to schools across Merton. 21 sporting celebrities, 18 young sporting hopefuls, 39 sponsors and partners, 27 True Volunteers and over 60 individuals from different walks of life all donated their time, expertise and resources to produce an inspirational film and book for young people. It is estimated the film would have cost over £90,000 to produce, but due to its partner ecosystem, only cost £400.

Celebrities starring in the film and book include Jacquie Beltrao, Greg Rusedski, Will Greenwood, Steve Cram, Daley Thompson, Alec Stewart, Sean Kerly and John Scales.

The project aims to provide free sporting opportunities to 27,000 school children across the London Borough of Merton.

Nuffield School, Sri Lanka 
Nuffield School for deaf and blind children is located in Kaithady, which is in the Jaffna District situated in the Northern Province of Sri Lanka. Civil War fought for three decades in Sri Lanka had a disastrous impact on the entire country, leaving most of the buildings at the Nuffield School badly damaged. To significantly improve the future for the school children, True Volunteer Foundation raised funds for a complete refurbishment of the facilities. Completed in September 2012, the renovated facilities now provide accommodation and schooling for up to 300 deaf and/or blind children per year.

Vinh Quang Primary School, Vietnam  
Vinh Quang Primary School educated approximately 100 children in Kien Giang province within Vietnam. To enable the school to support more local children, in 2012 True Volunteer Foundation funded a two-storey extension, doubling the school's size and adding classroom space and resources to allow Vinh Quang Primary School to accommodate up to 300 school children.

All funds for the project were raised by a group of cyclists who took part in True Volunteer Foundation's Cycle Vietnam event in November 2011. The team cycled 400 km across Vietnam and Cambodia, raising thousands of pounds to build the school in Vietnam and support an Orphanage in Cambodia.

To promote the challenge within the UK, True Volunteer Foundation managed two events in the run up to the trip to increase visibility. This included entering a team of cyclists in Cyclothon UK 2011 and hosting a celebrity tennis tournament day at David Lloyd Leisure Centre in Raynes Park. Special guests attending the celebrity tennis tournament included Mike Read, Victor Ubogu and Sue Mappin.

Supporters 
True Volunteer Foundation is  supported by 42 high-profile public figures and celebrities. Supporters include Sir Cliff Richard, Jacquie Beltrao, Steve Cram, Ainsley Harriott, Greg Rusedski, Sean Kerly and Daley Thompson.

True Volunteer Foundation is also supported by Baroness Helen Newlove, and was part of her vision of a ‘Civic Service’ through providing volunteering opportunities for the Department for Communities and Local Government (DCLG) ‘Social Action Week’ in November 2011 and 2012.

In conjunction with Baroness Newlove, True Volunteer Foundation set up and launched the Newlove Neighbourhoods Fund, an integrated nationwide programme which addresses crime in seven regions across the UK. Through its work with Baroness Newlove, True Volunteer Foundation featured as the preferred partner in projects related to the Big Society, and featured in two government reports commissioned by Prime Minister David Cameron.

Awards 
In 2013, True Volunteer Foundation received an award from the Merton Partnership Volunteering awards for its Wimbledon Sporting Project and won the People's Choice Award at the Forum3 exhibition in 2010.

References

Charities based in London